A by-election was held for the New South Wales Legislative Assembly electorate of Carcoar on 16 October 1862 because William Watt resigned.

Dates

Result

William Watt resigned.

See also
Electoral results for the district of Carcoar
List of New South Wales state by-elections

References

1862 elections in Australia
New South Wales state by-elections
1860s in New South Wales